Samy Colman (born 23 April 1996) is a Moroccan equestrian.

Career highlights 

 March 2017: winner of the CSI1 in Cagnes-sur-Mer (1.35m) with Baloucetta.
 May 2017: winner of the Grand Prix Top Junior Talents (under 25) in La Baule with Simara Alia 
 September 2018: second in the Grand Prix of His Majesty King Mohammed VI at the Official Showjumping Competition in Tetouan

2020 Tokyo Summer Olympics 
The rider qualified to represent Morocco in the 2020 Tokyo Summer Olympics and was slated to compete in showjumping events alongside Abdelkebir Ouaddar, Ghali Boukaa and Ali Ahrach. Colman had to announce his withdrawal from the 2020 Olympic Games after testing positive for COVID-19.

References

External links 
 
 
 

1996 births
Living people
Moroccan male equestrians
Show jumping riders